Arthill is a village in Cheshire, England in the United Kingdom.

References

Villages in Cheshire